John William Meece (born June 3, 1843) was a member of the Mississippi Legislature in 1911.

He also served as a Sergeant for the Confederate States of America during the American Civil War.  After the war, Meece taught for several years in different counties and was married to Elizabeth Jason Jefcoat in 1874. Meece was elected to the Mississippi Legislature in 1911.

References

1843 births
People of Mississippi in the American Civil War
Democratic Party members of the Mississippi House of Representatives
Confederate States Army soldiers
Schoolteachers from Mississippi
Baptists from Mississippi
1924 deaths
People from Water Valley, Mississippi
19th-century Baptists